Kahaluu-Keauhou is a census-designated place (CDP) in Hawaii County, Hawaii, United States. The population was 3,549 at the 2010 census, up from 2,414 at the 2000 census.

Geography
Kahaluu-Keauhou is located on the western side of the island of Hawaii at  (19.575554, -155.960522). It is bordered to the north by Holualoa, to the east by Honalo, and to the west by the Pacific Ocean.

On the coast is the historic district of Kahaluu Bay.

Demographics

2000 Census data
As of the census of 2000, there were 2,414 people, 1,000 households, and 661 families residing in the CDP. The racial makeup of the CDP was 65.53% White, 0.37% African American, 0.33% Native American, 11.35% Asian, 7.87% Pacific Islander, 0.79% from other races, and 13.75% from two or more races. Hispanic or Latino of any race were 4.02% of the population.

Of 1,000 households, 18.6% had children under the age of 18 living with them, 54.4% were married couples living together, 8.8% had a female householder with no husband present, and 33.8% were non-families. 24.4% of all households were made up of individuals, and 9.7% had someone living alone who was 65 years of age or older.  The average household size was 2.33 and the average family size was 2.68.

In the CDP the population was spread out, with 16.4% under the age of 18, 5.0% from 18 to 24, 19.8% from 25 to 44, 36.0% from 45 to 64, and 22.7% who were 65 years of age or older.  The median age was 49 years. For every 100 females, there were 101.5 males.  For every 100 females age 18 and over, there were 97.0 males.

The median income for a household in the CDP was $52,522, and the median income for a family was $60,368. Males had a median income of $31,583 versus $26,389 for females. The per capita income for the CDP was $33,067.  About 8.6% of families and 13.4% of the population were below the poverty line, including 35.9% of those under age 18 and 3.9% of those age 65 or over.

References

Census-designated places in Hawaii County, Hawaii
Populated places on Hawaii (island)
Populated coastal places in Hawaii